Jagatheesan Kousik (born 23 May 1995) is an Indian cricketer who plays for Tamil Nadu in domestic cricket. He is an all-rounder who bats right-handed and bowls right arm medium pace.

Early life
Kousik was born on 23 May 1995 in Coimbatore, Tamil Nadu, India. Kousik's family does not have a cricketing background. He started playing at the age of 10. He started playing for the Coimbatore District Cricket Association as a 10-year-old.

Domestic cricket
Kousik has represented Tamil Nadu in age-group levels. He made his first class debut for the side on 1 October 2015 in the 2015–16 Ranji Trophy. He made his maiden first-class century in his second match, scoring 151 off 272 balls. He made his List A debut on 10 December 2015 in the 2015–16 Vijay Hazare Trophy. He made his Twenty20 debut on 2 January 2016 in the 2015–16 Syed Mushtaq Ali Trophy. He has represented Ruby Trichy Warriors and Siechem Madurai Panthers in Tamil Nadu Premier League (TNPL).

Playing style
Kousik is rated a good all-rounder. He is an economic bowler who can swing the ball both ways.

References

External links
 

1995 births
Living people
Indian cricketers
Tamil Nadu cricketers
People from Coimbatore